Staten Island is an island in the Sacramento-San Joaquin River Delta, twenty-five kilometres northwest of Stockton. The  is bordered on the east and south by South Mokelumne River, and on the west and north by North Mokelumne River. It is in San Joaquin County, and managed by Reclamation District 38.

The island is privately owned by The Nature Conservancy. It is a popular stopping point for migratory sandhill cranes.

See also
List of islands of California

References

Islands of San Joaquin County, California
Islands of the Sacramento–San Joaquin River Delta
Islands of Northern California
Mokelumne River